Mustapha Cassiem (born 19 March 2002) is a South African field hockey player who plays as a forward for the South African national team.

His brother Dayaan Cassiem also is an international hockey player.

International career
Cassiem made his debut for the outdoor South African national team in February 2020 in a test match against the United States. He competed in the 2020 Summer Olympics. In August 2021 he was nominated for the FIH Rising Star of the Year at the FIH Hockey Stars Awards 2020–21.

Honours

Club

Western Province Hockey
2018 U16 Boys Hockey Nationals (A Section) - Leading Goalscorer

Mapungubwe Mambas
2019 PHL Men - Young Player of the Tournament

South Africa U21
2022 Senior IPT Men - A Section - Top Goalscorer

South Africa
2023 FIH Hockey World Cup - JSP Foundation Best Junior Player of the Tournament
2023 Men's FIH Indoor Hockey World Cup - Best Junior Player

References

External links

2002 births
Living people
Male field hockey forwards
Field hockey players at the 2020 Summer Olympics
South African male field hockey players
Olympic field hockey players of South Africa
Place of birth missing (living people)
Alumni of Diocesan College, Cape Town
Field hockey players at the 2018 African Youth Games
Field hockey players at the 2022 Commonwealth Games
21st-century South African people
2023 Men's FIH Hockey World Cup players

2023 FIH Indoor Hockey World Cup players
South African people of Malay descent